Pterolophia gregalis is a species of beetle in the family Cerambycidae. It was described by Warren Samuel Fisher in 1927.

References

gregalis
Beetles described in 1927